The greater vasa parrot (Coracopsis vasa) is one of two species of vasa parrot, the other being the lesser vasa parrot C. nigra. The greater vasa parrot can be found throughout Madagascar and the Comoros.

Taxonomy
The bird was described by George Shaw an English zoologist in 1812. There are three subspecies:
 Coracopsis vasa, (Shaw) 1812
 Coracopsis vasa comorensis, (Peters,W) 1854
 Coracopsis vasa drouhardi, Lavauden 1929
 Coracopsis vasa vasa, (Shaw) 1812

The bird is placed in the genus Mascarinus by some authorities.

Description
The greater vasa parrot breeding season is uncertain but is probably between October to December. It has a very unusual breeding biology and mating system. Females are 25% larger than males and are physically dominant. The species lives in loose polygynandrous groups wherein each female has at least three to eight sexual partners. The males have re-evolved a phallus and copulations can last up to 90 minutes. Copulations come in two varieties, short duration (1–3 seconds) and long duration (averaging 36 minutes), with the latter involving a copulatory tie. A copulatory tie usually refers to mammals such canines where the animals are unable to part during mating due to the swelling of the penis within the females body. During brooding and chick-rearing, females shed their head feathers and develop bright orange skin coloration, and also sing complex songs from perches close to the nest. These serve to attract males to approach and regurgitate food, which the female accepts while off the nest. The females also defend a territory around their nest from other females during this period.

Ecology
In Madagascar it is more common in portions of the dry deciduous forests, compared with the lesser vasa parrot which is more common in the humid forests of the east coast. Feeds, in large, noisy flocks, on wild berries, fruits, nuts and seeds and also on cultivated maize, millet and rice. The bird is active on moonlit nights, otherwise they roost in large noisy flocks in the tops of large trees. A lookout warns of danger.

Greater vasa parrots in Lincolnshire Wildlife Park have been recorded using grinding technology – the first non-human animal to be observed doing this. They were observed holding date stones and pebbles in their beak to grind calicium-rich dust from seashells. It happens most frequently just before the breeding season and the males were observed doing it more often. A possible explanation is the females need the extra calcium to build eggshells and the males feed them with regurgitated food.

Status
This bird is common in some areas and overall the population is thought to be declining, but not enough to classify this bird as vulnerable. The International Union for Conservation of Nature has classified the conservation status of this bird as of least concern.

References

greater vasa parrot
Birds of the Comoros
Birds of Madagascar
greater vasa parrot
Taxa named by George Shaw